The 1992 Los Angeles Raiders season was their 33rd in the National Football League (NFL). They were unable to improve upon their previous season's output of 9–7, winning only seven games. This was the first time in three seasons the team failed to qualify for the playoffs.

Offseason

NFL Draft

Staff

Roster

Schedule

Game summaries

Week 1

Week 2

Week 3

Week 4

Week 5

Source: Pro-Football-Reference.com

Week 6

Week 17

Source: Pro-Football-Reference.com

Standings

References

Los Angeles Raiders seasons
Los Angeles Raiders
Los